Westgate station can refer to:

Westgate station (Las Vegas Monorail) in Nevada, United States
Westgate station (Metro Transit) in Minnesota, United States
Westgate-on-Sea railway station in Kent, England
Wakefield Westgate railway station in West Yorkshire, England
Rotherham Westgate railway station, a former station in South Yorkshire, England
Westgate station, Johannesburg in Ferreirasdorp, South Africa
Westgate-in-Weardale railway station, a planned station on the Weardale Railway in England